Luigi Vitale (born 5 October 1987) is an Italian footballer who plays as a left midfielder, left back, or a left wing back.

Career
A former Napoli youth product, Vitale began his professional career with the Napoli senior side in 2005, but spent several seasons on loan with other clubs in Italy. On 12 July 2011, he joined Bologna from Napoli on a season-long loan.

On 4 August 2012, he moved on loan to Ternana.

In July 2016, he joined Salernitana.

On 31 January 2019, he signed a 2.5-year contract with Verona. On 31 January 2020, Vitale joined Spezia on loan.

On 1 February 2021, he joined Frosinone.

References

External links
 

1987 births
People from Castellammare di Stabia
Footballers from Campania
Living people
Italian footballers
S.S.C. Napoli players
S.S. Virtus Lanciano 1924 players
U.S. Livorno 1915 players
Bologna F.C. 1909 players
Ternana Calcio players
S.S. Juve Stabia players
U.S. Salernitana 1919 players
Hellas Verona F.C. players
Spezia Calcio players
Frosinone Calcio players
Serie A players
Serie B players
Serie C players
Association football forwards
Association football defenders